Elections were held in Indian state of West Bengal in February 1969 to elect 280 members to the West Bengal Legislative Assembly. United Front formed the government with Ajoy Mukherjee as the Chief Minister. United Front won a landslide 214 seats and 49.7% of the votes.

Background
President's Rule had been introduced in the state on 20 February 1968. Following which, the previous legislative assembly was dissolved.

Results

Elected members

References
 

State Assembly elections in West Bengal
1960s in West Bengal
West Bengal